Kadhal Dot Com is a 2004 Tamil language romantic drama film directed by Selvaraj. The film stars Prasanna, Anu and Shruthi Raj, while Vadivelu, S. V. Shekher and Prashanth Kharun played supporting roles.

Cast
Prasanna as Vinod
Anu Sasi as Sandhya
Shruthi Raj as Priya
Vadivelu as Pichu
Ahilan
 Prashanth Kharun as Guna
S. V. Shekher
Nirosha
Madhan Bob
Pandu
Sethu Vinayagam
Radhika Chaudhari in an item number.

Production
The film marked the debut in Tamil films for Anu, daughter of Malayalam director I. V. Sasi.

Release
A critic from The Hindu noted "at a time when much-hyped, hero-backed films end up being mere dampeners, a low-key film like  this comes with no unsavoury loudness or lewdness, is at least a decent offering." Another critic noted "the story has predictable turnings. At times it appears as if we are watching an old film."

Soundtrack

The soundtrack of the film was composed by Bharadwaj.

References

2004 films
2000s Tamil-language films
Films scored by Bharadwaj (composer)